Strawberry Dam (National ID # CA00388), also known as Main Strawberry Dam, is a dam in Tuolumne County, California.

Background
It impounds the South Fork Stanislaus River exclusively for hydroelectric power generation, now owned and operated by Pacific Gas and Electric Company as one of the company's more than 170 dams.

Pinecrest Lake
Recreation includes boating, fishing, camping, and winter sports.

Pinecrest Lake hosts the Pinecrest Recreation Area, part of the Stanislaus National Forest.

Pinecrest Lake was home to Camp Stephens.

Gallery

See also 
List of dams and reservoirs in California
List of lakes in California

References 

Dams in California
Dams on the Stanislaus River
Buildings and structures in Tuolumne County, California
Masonry dams
Pacific Gas and Electric Company dams
Dams completed in 1916
Reservoirs in Tuolumne County, California
Reservoirs in Northern California